This is a list of bridges and viaducts in Andorra, including those for pedestrians and vehicular traffic.

Historical and architectural interest bridges

Notes and references 
 Notes

 

 

 Others references

See also 

 Transport in Andorra
 Geography of Andorra
 List of rivers of Andorra
 :ca:Llista de carreteres d'Andorra  - List of roads in Andorra

External links 

 
 

Andorra
 
Bridges